Japanese street fashion refers to a number of styles of contemporary modern clothing in Japan. Created from a mix of both local and foreign fashion brands, Japanese street fashions tend to have their own distinctive style, with some considered to be extreme and avant-garde, with similarities to the haute couture styles seen on European catwalks.

History
As early as the 1950s, there were a few brands specially catered to street fashion, such as Onitsuka Tiger (now known as the ASICS).

In addition, the emergence of strong youth culture in the 1960s and 1970s that continues today (especially in Harajuku, a district in Shibuya, Tokyo) drives much of the development of new styles, looks, and fashion subcultures. The rise of consumerism, which played an important part in Japan's "national character" during its economic boom in the 1980s, continues to influence fashion purchases, even after this economic bubble burst in the 1990s. These factors result in the swift turnover and variability in styles popular at any one time.

In 2003, Japanese hip-hop, which had long been present among underground Tokyo's club scene, influenced the mainstream fashion industry. The popularity of the music was so influential that Tokyo's youth imitated their favorite hip hop stars from the way they dress with oversized clothes to tanned skin.

Though extremely popular in the 1990s and early 2000s, many trends experienced a levelling off in the later 2000s and onwards; the rise and fall of many of these trends had been chronicled by Shoichi Aoki since 1997 in the fashion magazine Fruits, which was a notable magazine for the promotion of street fashion in Japan.

Fashion industry and popular brands

Although Japanese street fashion is known for its mix-match of different styles and genres, and there is no single sought-after brand that can consistently appeal to all fashion groups, the huge demand created by the fashion-conscious population is fed and supported by Japan's vibrant fashion industry. Issey Miyake, Yohji Yamamoto and Comme des Garçons are often said to be the three cornerstone brands of Japanese fashion. Together they were particularly recognized as a Japanese fashion force in the early 1980s for their intensive use of monochrome color and cutting-edge design.

The social motives driving interaction with and involvement in personal fashion choices and wider fashion movements within Japan are complex. Firstly, the comparatively large quantity of disposable income available to Japanese youth is significant; many argue this has been, historically, made possible through a greater degree of Japanese youth living at home with their parents for much longer than in other countries, reducing living expenses and thus making larger spending on clothing possible.

Japan is also known for its significant consumption of foreign luxury brands. According to data from 2006, Japan consumed 41 percent of the entire world's luxury goods. The blue line of Burberry is among the most successful in this arena.

Japanese street fashion influences the West Coast of the United States. High-end fashion brands like Comme des Garçons have played a big role in the global industry since the 1980s, especially through frequent cross-over guest design with other brands. In 2008, Rei Kawakubo designed for Louis Vuitton and H&M. Harajuku Fashion was ranked 5th in the fashion field of Google Search of the Year in 2019.

Modern Japanese street fashion
Though the styles have changed over the years, street fashion is still prominent in Tokyo today. Young adults can often be found wearing subculture attire in large urban fashion districts such as Harajuku (Ura-Harajuku), Aoyama, Ginza, Odaiba, Shinjuku and Shibuya.

Lolita

Containing many different themes within its boundaries, Lolita has become one of the larger, more recognizable styles in Japanese street fashion and has gained a following worldwide. Skirts or dresses are usually worn at or below knee length with petticoats beneath for volume. Blouses or tops are lace-trimmed or ruffled in the Victorian or Rococo style. The length of the socks or stockings can go from ankle to thigh level and may be topped with lace. Wearers of this fashion style often put on Mary Janes or boots. The more well-known sub-styles within Lolita fashion are as follows:

 Gothic Lolita - Lolita with a heavy influence from the Eastern and Victorian Goth style. Often characterized by dark colors, and accessories adorned with motifs such as skeletons, bats, spiders and other popular gothic 'icons', such as characters from Tim Burton films. Victorian iron gates and architectural designs are also often seen in dress prints. Bonnets, rectangle headdresses and brooches are popular accessories for Gothic Lolita.
 Sweet Lolita - the most childlike style, mostly characterized by baby animals, fairy tale themes and innocent, childlike attire. It was originally inspired by Victorian children's clothing and the  culture that is very prevalent in Japan. Pastel colors are often used, although some dresses or skirts may feature darker or muted colors as well. Large head bows, cute purses and stuffed animals are popular accessories for Sweet Lolita.
Classic Lolita - a sub-style more closely resembling the historical fashion of the Rococo or Victorian eras. The colors that are used in this look are usually muted, thus giving this sub-style a more mature feel. Floral prints and solid colors are common, although fancier prints are not unheard of as well. Small head bows, bonnets, rectangle headdresses and hair corsages are popular accessories for Classic Lolita.
 Punk Lolita - an experimental style, mixing the influences of Punk with Lolita. It can sometimes look deconstructed or crazy, while keeping most of the 'Lolita silhouette'.
 Ouji - also known as 'boy style', are the more masculine counterparts of lolita, influenced by Victorian boys' clothing. 'Prince pants', which are short capri-style pants that are cut off the knee, usually with some sort of detail (such as lace-edged cuffs) are commonly worn with masculine blouses, top hats, knee socks and other accessories.

The  style of Japanese street fashion became popular among Japanese girls in the early 1990s and peaked in the early 2000s.  falls into the larger subculture of  fashion.  typically includes brightly colored outfits, mini-skirts, and tie-dyed sarongs. The  style consists of bleached hair, a deep tan, fake eyelashes, black and white eyeliner, bracelets, earrings, rings, necklaces and platform shoes.

Many people consider Namie Amuro to have been the leading figure of  style. Exactly after her public appearances with tanned skin and dyed hair, a lot of Japanese girls started to follow her example. The terms  and  refer to the extreme ends of the  style.

The  look is based on a high school uniform, but with a shorter skirt, loose socks, and often dyed hair and a scarf as well. This style was prominent in the 1990s, and it started gaining its popularity again since the end of 2020.

While  fashion has not been widely popular since the 1990s, the stereotypical  look is often portrayed, and even caricatured, in many forms of Japanese media such as anime, manga and films. These are usually worn open, with no shirt underneath, showing off bandaged torsos and matching baggy pants tucked inside tall boots.

The  style originated in the late 1990s/early 2000s and rose to great popularity both in and outside Japan. It is exemplified by singer Kyary Pamyu Pamyu, who rose to prominence in the Harajuku fashion scene before her musical debut. The wearers usually stick to color palettes for their decora, examples including Pink Decora, Red Decora, Dark Decora, and Rainbow Decora. A plain shirt and hoodie were often worn with short tutu-like skirts. The hair (often worn in low ponytails with long bangs) and make-up itself tend to be quite plain. Stockings, legwarmers, arm warmers, and knee socks are also worn over each other in different layers. Common details also include leopard prints and patterned dental masks. The style has since decreased in popularity but still has a large following worldwide.

Visual 

Visual  is a style created in the mid-1980s by Japanese musicians consisting of striking makeup, unusual hair styles and flamboyant costumes, similar to Western glam rock and glam metal. Androgyny is also a popular aspect of the style. Some of the more well-known and influential artists of the style include X Japan, Luna Sea, Versailles, The Gazette, Mejibray, Royz, L'Arc en Ciel, An Cafe, Malice Mizer, and Diaura.

is the opposite side of Visual , with bright colors and many pop impressions. The music is more happy sounding, the lyrics lighter and happier. Bands include An Cafe, Panic Channel, Ichigo69, Lolita23q, SuG, Delacroix, LM.C, and Aicle.

The term derives from the Japanese pronunciation of "underground", which refers to its origins in underground theater. The clothes tend to be heavily influenced by traditional Japanese elements as well as the Showa era (1926-1989) but with a Goth spin to it. While kimono are the most common used by visual  artist, the style also often features modified japanese school uniforms. Motifs and accessories are themed around post-war Japan and the occult.

Cult Party 
Cult Party , named after the Harajuku shop Cult Party (now known as the Virgin Mary), is a style that was popular around the early 2010s and is based on Western religious artifacts like crosses or bibles. Common aspects include crosses wired in yarn, layers of fabric in soft colors, lots of cream lace, satin bows and bible prints. The make-up and hairstyle is not as over the top as other styles. Cult Party  is often worn with natural looking make-up without any larger emphasis on the eyes and simple hair-dos with roses. Cult Party  is considered by some to be a subset of Dolly .

Dolly 
Dolly  is a style based on Japan's view of the Middle Ages and European fairy tales, especially the Brothers Grimm and Hans Christian Andersen. It includes a lot of vintage-style clothing and sometimes has religious symbols. Grimoire is a store in Japan that has been described as "the pioneering store behind the Dolly- fashion scene".

Fairy 
Fairy  is a childlike style based on 1980s fashion. Outfits are made up of pastel colors, angels, toys and generally cute motifs and elements and accessories from Western toy lines of the 1980s and early 1990s, such as Polly Pocket, My Little Pony, Strawberry Shortcake, Rainbow Brite, Popples, Lady Lovely Locks, Barbie, Wuzzles, and Care Bears. Pastel-colored hair is common, although natural hair is also popular, and hairstyles are usually kept simple and decorated with anything cute or pastel; bows are a common theme. The term "Fairy " originated from the magazine called Zipper (despite common belief that Sayuri Tabuchi [Tavuchi], the owner of Tokyo fashion store Spank!, was the accidental creator of the style).

( meaning "forest") uses soft, loosely fitting layers of garments such as floaty dresses and cardigans. It places an emphasis on natural fabrics (cotton, linen, wool) and hand-made or vintage accessories with a nature theme. The color scheme tends to be light and neutral, but patterns such as gingham and florals may also be used. In terms of hairstyles, bangs (often curled) and braids are very popular. The style is similar to Dolly  in that the aim is to create a doll-like appearance, but in a more casual, earthy manner.

Peeps
Peeps is a 90s inspired sporty goth style that has been popularized in Harajuku's underground scene by the online magazine PEEPS. It was voted one of the major trends for 2020 in the yearly trend forecast by the japanese women's magazine Mery.

Kimono Style
Despite the widespread nature of Western clothing in Japan, Japanese fashion is still influenced by traditional clothing, with people still wearing the kimono in daily life, though most people wear it only for weddings, graduations and other formal occasions.
 
Despite the heavily-reduced numbers of people wearing kimono as everyday clothing, the younger generation in Japan can still be seen to mix kimono and modern style in fashion, wearing modern footwear and accessories instead of the typical  and  usually worn. There are even modern designers who have used the kimono as inspiration, such as the "TANZEN" collection from designer Issey Miyake.

Genderless

In the mid 2010s, genderless fashion became widespread and focused on people wearing clothing that do not conform to their assigned gender. The subculture is mostly dominated by men, where they are known as "genderless men."

Designers featured at international fashion weeks

Tomoko Yamanaka's work was featured at London Fashion Week, 2010.

See also

2000s in Japanese fashion
2010s in Asian fashion
Youth culture
Camp (style)
Fruits (magazine)
Cuteness in Japanese culture
Madam/Aristocrat
Elegant Gothic Aristocrat
Neo-Victorian
Cosplay
Visual Kei
Poupee Girl
Baby the stars shine bright

References

External links 
Kobe Collection
Tokyo Girls Collection
Tokyo fashion.com
Style arena
Fashion Press

Japanese popular culture
Japanese subcultures
 
Street fashion